The 1964 Australian Grand Prix was a motor race held at the Sandown Park circuit in suburban Melbourne, Victoria, Australia on 9 February 1964.  
It was the twenty ninth Australian Grand Prix and was also Round 5 of the 1964 Tasman Series and Round 1 of the 1964 Australian Drivers' Championship. The race was open to Racing Cars complying with the Australian National Formula or the Australian 1½ Litre Formula.

Defending winner Jack Brabham won the race driving a Repco Brabham. It was his third and final Australian Grand Prix victory.

Classification 

Results as follows:

Notes
 Pole position: Jack Brabham – 1:09.6
 Starters: 21
 Winner's average speed: 96.7 mph (155.6 km/h)
 Fastest lap: Jack Brabham / Bruce McLaren – 1:09.5
p

In popular culture
A "science-fiction" version of the 1964 Australian Grand Prix was depicted five years before it took place in the American film On the Beach (1959), based on the Nevil Shute novel of the same name.

References

External links
 Open Wheelers 1964, autopics.com.au
 XXIX Australian Grand Prix, members.optusnet.com.au/dandsshaw, as archived at web.archive.org

Grand Prix
Australian Grand Prix
Motorsport at Sandown
Tasman Series
Australian Grand Prix